In Judeo-Christian folklore the angel Kushiel, meaning "Rigid One of God",  punishes individuals in Hell.

In Hebrew writings
Kushiel is one of seven angels of punishment along with Hutriel, Lahatiel, Makatiel, Puriel (also written Pusiel), Rogziel and Shoftiel.   

As a "presiding angel of Hell," he is said to punish nations with a whip made of fire, although, along with the other angels of punishment, is reported in Second Book of Enoch 10:3 to dwell in the third heaven.

Fictional references
Kushiel appears as a character in Jacqueline Carey's series of novels entitled Kushiel's Legacy.  Kushiel was the punishing angel of the Yeshuites' One God.

Kushiel is a recurring character in John Connolly's books featuring private eye Charlie Parker. Kushiel is referred to as The Collector and is only referred to by name in The Reflecting Eye: A Charlie Parker Novella and the recent The Whisperers. He also appears in The Unquiet and The Wrath of Angels. He is also in A Time of Torment and A Game of Ghosts.

Kushiel is a character in Hamish Steele's DeadEndia graphic novel series, presenting as an intimidating angel in golden armor tasked with punishing supernatural entities who travel between realms without the proper permits and permissions. Said punishment often involves impalement. Steele says of Kushiel's design, "I wanted to create a really alien feeling - but as if the alien was trying to look human - not as a disguise but as a very misjudged attempt at respect. I see the angelic face mask and humanoid body armour as being a way to make Kushiel seem less threatening when it comes to our world - but obviously it doesn’t work."

See also
 Jewish angelic hierarchy
 List of angels in theology
 Zabaniyya

References

Angels in Christianity
Individual angels